Meredith Strang Burgess (born April 27, 1956) is an American politician from Maine. A Republican, Strang Burgess served three terms (2006-2012) in the Maine House of Representatives, representing the town of Cumberland.

Strang Burgess was a co-sponsor of the successful 2009 same-sex marriage bill. The bill was repealed via people's veto in November of that year. Three years later, in 2012, Strang Burgess was one of three sitting Republican state legislators to support the successful state referendum legalizing same sex marriage.

In December 2013, Strang Burgess was rumored to be a potential candidate for U.S. Congress.

References

1956 births
Living people
People from Rockland, Maine
People from Cumberland, Maine
University of Maine alumni
Women state legislators in Maine
Republican Party members of the Maine House of Representatives